First Frame Entertainments is an Indian film and television production company, founded by Rajeev Reddy Yeduguru, and Sai Babu Jagarlamudi. Established in Hyderabad in 2009, the production house is one of the active in Tollywood with nine films, including Kanche (2015).

Film production

Television production

Awards

References

External links

 

Film production companies based in Hyderabad, India
2009 establishments in Andhra Pradesh
Indian companies established in 2009